The 1988 Adelaide Bicentennial Carnival was the 22nd edition of the Australian National Football Carnival, an Australian rules football State of Origin competition. Australia was celebrating its Bicentenary in 1988, so the carnival was known as the 'Bicentennial Carnival'. It took place over four days from 2 March until 5 March, and the matches were played at Football Park and Norwood Oval.

Ten teams were involved, including all the states and territories, making it the most heavily contested competition. They were divided into two sections. South Australia, Victoria, Western Australia and New South Wales were in Section One. Although traditionally the Tasmanians had enjoyed more success in the interstate arena than New South Wales, the latter had 22 VFL players in its squad compared to the island state's 15, which helped them obtain the final Section One spot.

Section Two was occupied by the Australian Capital Territory, Northern Territory, Queensland, Tasmania and two non-regional teams. The Australian Amateurs was one of those, a squad of amateur players from across the country's leagues. Finally, the Victorian Association representative team made up the remainder of the group, but selection for this team was not restricted to Victorian Football Association players. If a footballer, now competing elsewhere, had started his career in the Victorian Football Association—such as Terry Wallace, for example—then he was eligible to join the squad. The same rules applied to the other teams, so, if a Tasmanian-born player had started his career at West Perth, he could be selected for either Tasmania or Western Australia.

Attendances at the tournament were lower than expected, and overall the tournament ran at a $30,000 loss. The winning state was originally to have received a $40,000 prize, with incrementally lower prizes for all other states; however, these prizes were abandoned due to the operating loss.

Results

Squads
Team captains and vice captains:
Amateurs: Dave Perry 
Australian Capital Territory: 
New South Wales: Terry Daniher 
Northern Territory: Maurice Rioli (C), Michael McLean (VC) 
Queensland: 
South Australia: Chris McDermott 
Tasmania: 
Victoria (VFA): Barry Round 
Victoria (VFL): 
West Australia: Ross Glendinning

Honours

All-Australians

Leading goal-kickers
 Dennis Dunn (NT) – 16 goals
 Michael Long (NT) – 9 goals
 Stephen Kernahan (SA) – 8 goals
 Stephen Nichols (TAS) – 8 goals
 Paul Salmon (VIC) – 8 goals
 Bruce Lindner (SA) – 6 goals

Medalists
Fos Williams Medals
 Stephen Kernahan (SA)
 Mark Mickan (SA)
Simpson Medal
 Dwayne Lamb (WA)
Tassie Medal
 Paul Salmon (VIC)
Dolphin Medal
 Terry Wallace (VFA)

References

Australian rules football State of Origin
Adelaide Bicentennial Carnival, 1988
Australian bicentennial commemorations
Adelaide Bicentennial Carnival
Adelaide Bicentennial Carnival